Grand Internal Princess Consort Wanyang (Hangul: 완양부대부인, Hanja: 完陽府大夫人; 19 February 1804 – 19 February 1840), of the Jeonju Choi clan, was a member of the Joseon royal family, as the legitimate wife of Grand Internal Prince Jeongye. As the primary consort, she became the adoptive mother of King Cheoljong of Joseon and was given the royal title after his ascension. She also bore Jeongye a son, Prince Hoepyeong.

Life 
The future Grand Internal Princess Consort Wanyang was born on 19 February 1804 (4th year of King Sunjo's reign) in Yeonji-dong, as the daughter of Choi Su-chang and his wife, Lady Yi of the Gwangju Yi clan. Her paternal grandfather was Choi Jong-hyeong, who was an immediate descendant of Choi Sun-jak (최순작). Choi Sun-jak served as a general in the Goryeo Dynasty, and was one of the progenitors of clan. Her direct ancestor was Duke Pyeongdo (평도공, 平度公) Jukjeong Choi Yu-gyeong (죽정 최유경, 竹亭 崔有慶; 1343 - 1413), who served as a public servant in the late Goryeo for King Gongyang and King U, and for King Taejo, King Jeongjong, and King Taejong during the early Joseon Dynasty. 

Lady Choi was said to have always been at ease despite difficult family circumstances and according to Cheoljong's Annals, she lived peacefully with Grand Internal Prince Jeongye's two concubines.

In 1830, when King Sunjo gave a special order to release members of Prince Euneon's family from exile, she and her husband were able to live in Hanseong again. 

The Princess Consort died on her birthday, 19 February 1840 at the age of 36 in her husband’s private residence, Gyeonghaeng Hall.

Tomb
Her tomb was first located in Jungheung-dong, Hado-myeon, Yangju-gun, Gyeonggi-do, but was relocated to Seondan-dong and joined to Jeongye Daewongun's tomb on the right side. It was built by Kim Jwa-geun, Queen Sunwon's younger brother, in 1851 (2nd year of King Cheoljong's reign) along with her tombstone.

Family 
 Father - Choi Su-chang (최수창, 崔秀昌)
 Grandfather - Choi Jong-hyeong (최종형, 崔悰亨)
 Mother - Lady Yi of the Gwangju Yi clan (광주 이씨, 廣州 李氏) 
 Grandfather - Yi Bong-ui (이봉의, 李鳳儀)
 Older brother - Choi Yeong-hui (최영희, 崔英熙) (? - September 1844)

 Husband - Yi Gwang, Grand Internal Prince Jeongye (전계대원군 이광) (29 April 1785 - 14 December 1841)
 Father-in-law - Yi In, Prince Euneon (은언군 이인) (1 February 1754 - 30 June 1801)
 Mother-in-law - Princess Consort Jeonsan of the Jeonju Yi clan (전산군부인 이씨, 全山郡夫人 李氏) (19 December 1764 - 4 June 1819)
 Issue 
 Son - Yi Myeong, Prince Hoepyeong (회평군 명) (11 September 1827 - 6 September 1844)
 Unnamed daughter-in-law 
 Adoptive son - Yi Gyeong-eung, Prince Yeongpyeong (영평군 경응) (20 July 1828 - 1 February 1902)
 Adoptive daughter-in-law - Lady Shin of the Pyeongsan Shin clan (정경부인 평산 신씨, 貞敬夫人 平山 申氏) (1832 - 1857); daughter of Shin Jae-jun (신재준, 申在準)
 Adoptive daughter-in-law - Lady Kim of the Cheongdo Kim clan (정경부인 청도 김씨, 貞敬夫人 淸道 金氏) (1839 - 1921); daughter of Kim Jae-won (김재원, 金載元)
 Adoptive granddaughter - Lady Yi of the Jeonju Yi clan (숙부인 전주 이씨, 貞夫人 全州 李氏) (1866 - 1913)
 Adoptive grandson-in-law - Hwang Yeon-su (황연수, 黃演秀) of the Changwon Hwang clan (창원 황씨, 昌原 黄氏) (1866 - 1949)
 Adoptive great-grandson - Hwang Gyu-seong (황규성, 黃葵性) (1893 - 1949)
 Adoptive step-grandson - Yi Jae-sun, Prince Cheongan (청안군 이재순) (24 October 1851 - 2 March 1904)
 Adoptive step granddaughter-in-law - Lady Hong of the Pungsan Hong clan (정경부인 풍산 홍씨, 貞敬夫人 豊山 洪氏) (14 March 1853 - ?)
 Adoptive son - King Cheoljong of Joseon (조선 철종) (25 July 1831 - 16 January 1864) 
 Adoptive daughter-in-law - Queen Cheorin of the Andong Kim clan (철인왕후 김씨) (27 April 1837 - 12 June 1878)
 Adoptive grandson - Prince Royal Yi Yung-jun (원자 이융준, 李隆俊) (22 November 1858 - 25 May 1859)

References

Joseon people
1804 births
1840 deaths
19th-century Korean women
Choe clan of Jeonju